Novi High School (commonly Novi or NHS) is a public high school in Novi, Michigan, United States in Greater Detroit, serving students in grades 9–12. It is operated by Novi Community School District and was awarded Blue Ribbon School status in 1986-87 and 1999-00. Novi High School currently enrolls 2,020 students and has a 200 member faculty.

In addition to its primary purpose, Novi High School also houses adult education and various community recreational events, such as open swim in the swimming pool and basketball games in the gym and fieldhouse.

History

Novi High School was established in 1966 and graduated its first class in 1969. Prior to 1966, high school students from the Novi district attended Northville schools. The high school started out in a rural community that saw a tremendous amount of growth between the late 1960s to the early 2000s, and subsequently, the growth of the school.  The large influx of students from the 1980s to today led to several renovations and expansions of the high school.

The first high school was located in the current Novi Meadows school at Taft and 11 Mile Roads which was built in 1964. This building was known as Novi Junior High School from 1964 until 1968 and opened to students in the fall of 1966.  Explosive growth began in Novi during the 1970s and the district quickly outgrew the old high school, forcing the district to build the current high school which opened in the Fall of 1977. The current school was built on a portion of the Fuerst family farm.

The first renovation of the high school occurred from 1993 to 1996, boosting the building capacity by 40% and adding a telecommunications system, science labs, and a fine arts complex.

In 2001 a $75.6-million bond proposal passed for a second high school. A $37-million expansion and renovation that followed included an expansion of the cafeteria; a renovation of the auditorium with a new sound system, new seating, and new carpeting; and a new fine arts wing with a choir room, a black box theater, and a dance studio.

Notable alumni

 Sanjay Gupta, brain surgeon, former presidential medical advisor and chief medical correspondent for CNN
 Mitch Maier (class of 2000), baseball player for MLB's Kansas City Royals
 Michelle Rzepka (class of 2001), Olympic bobsledder. 
 Emily Samuelson, Olympic ice dancing international medalist, 2008 junior world champion
 Yang Liu (class of 2009), CEO of End Game Interactive (video game company), 2021 Forbes 30 under 30 Games 
 Madison Chock, 2015, 2020 national champion in ice dancing, 2014 Olympian
Bryan Dechart, American actor and voice actor

References

Further reading
"Novi High shows German students pride in U.S." The Detroit News. October 15, 2001. ID: det10649021.

External links

Public high schools in Michigan
Schools in Novi, Michigan
Educational institutions established in 1968
High schools in Oakland County, Michigan
1968 establishments in Michigan